California Christian College (CCC) is a private Free Will Baptist Bible college in Fresno, California.  This is one of several higher learning institutions associated with the Free Will Baptists.

History
It was founded in 1955 by 48 Free Will Baptist Churches who perceived a need for trained pastors in the western part of the United States. The first classes were held in the First Free Will Baptist church of Richmond, California. Since its founding, the college has operated continuously except for years 1985–86, when the governing board re-evaluated the college's needs and mission. In 2015, Cal Christian College moved to a temporary location at 5364 E. Belmont Avenue, the campus of Harmony Freewill Baptist Church in Fresno, as the board and administration prepare to begin construction on a new campus. CCC offers both associate's and bachelor's degrees, ranging from liberal studies to Christian ministry.

CCC is owned and operated by the California State Association of Free Will Baptists. The president functions as the administrative officer of the college under the direction of the Board of Trustees. The college's library contains resources with volumes printed from the 1800s to present. Students are from all over the world, with many denominational backgrounds. Cal Christian is accredited by Transnational Association of Christian Colleges and Schools (TRACS), is a member of the National Association of Christian College Admissions Personnel (NACCAP), and endorses the Principles of Good Practice approved by NACCAP.

References

External links
 

Free Will Baptist schools
Education in Fresno, California
Universities and colleges in Fresno County, California
Educational institutions established in 1955
1955 establishments in California
Transnational Association of Christian Colleges and Schools
Seminaries and theological colleges in California
Bible colleges